Stingaree is an American pre-Code romantic drama film directed by William A. Wellman released by RKO Radio Pictures in 1934. The film was based on a 1905 novel by Ernest William Hornung. Set in Australia, it stars Irene Dunne as Hilda Bouverie and Richard Dix as Stingaree. Hollywood had previously filmed the Hornung story as serials in 1915 and 1917, starring True Boardman.

Plot
In 1874 Australia, newly installed Police Inspector Radford boasts to wealthy Hugh Clarkson that he will capture the famous outlaw Stingaree, who has returned to the area. Hilda Bouverie is an impoverished servant working for the Clarksons. Mr. Clarkson is kind, but his wife treats Hilda and Annie, another servant, as menials. Mrs. Clarkson is excited by the news that Sir Julian Kent, a renowned British composer, is going to be her guest. She dreams of performing before him and becoming an opera star, but her singing is not good. Hilda begs to be allowed to sing as well, but Mrs. Clarkson turns her down. Meanwhile, Sir Julian stops over at a tavern, where Radford and his colleagues are drinking. When Stingaree enters, the policemen are suspicious of the stranger; he is searched, but no weapon is found. His sidekick Howie follows, only he is armed. They abduct Sir Julian. Unaware of this, Mrs. Clarkson goes off to meet Sir Julian.

While she is away, Hilda, who dreams of being an opera singer herself, plays Sir Julian's new song. When Stingaree enters the Clarkson residence to reconnoitre for a future robbery, she mistakes him for Sir Julian and sings for him. He is entranced, and praises her talent. When the Clarksons return, they are accompanied by Radford, who eventually recalls Stingaree. Unmasked, he flees, taking Hilda with him. When they reach his hideout, Stingaree is annoyed to find that Howie has let Sir Julian escape, foiling his attempt to get her an audition. Hilda tells him that her parents had the dream of singing, and that when they died she inherited the dream. Then Stingaree kisses her.

Sir Julian attends a recital at the Clarksons house, with Mrs. Clarkson singing his song disastrously. Howie holds the guests at gunpoint while Stingaree accompanies Hilda on the piano. Sir Julian is greatly impressed by her singing. As the guests congratulate her, Stingaree and Howie slip away. However, Radford manages to shoot and arrest Stingaree. When a furious Mrs. Clarkson fires Hilda, Sir Julian invites her to Europe. Hilda refuses, unwilling to abandon Stingaree, but then she receives a letter from him telling her to pursue her dream, and that he gave up his freedom for her. She leaves, taking Annie with her. Under Sir Julian's tutelage, she becomes a famous opera singer.

Though she cannot forget Stingaree, she agrees to marry Sir Julian. The night before the wedding, however, she tells him that she cannot go through with it. She is going to give up her career and return to Australia. He persuades her to perform at a concert in Melbourne, hoping that the contrast with the fabulous opera houses of Europe will change her mind. Meanwhile, Stingaree escapes, and holds up the new Governor-General's stagecoach. He borrows the man's uniform and attends the concert disguised as him. When he is recognized, the police pursue him. He sneaks into Hilda's dressing room. Hilda offers to give up her singing career for him. As the police try to break down the door, he picks her up in his arms and escapes through the window. They ride off together on his horse.

Cast
 Irene Dunne as Hilda Bouverie
 Richard Dix as Stingaree
 Mary Boland as Mrs. Clarkson
 Conway Tearle as Sir Julian Kent
 Andy Devine as Howie
 Henry Stephenson as Mr. Hugh Clarkson
 George Barraud as Inspector Radford
 Una O'Connor as Annie
 "Snub" Pollard as Victor
 Reginald Owen as The Governor-General
 Billy Bevan as Mac
 Robert Greig as The Innkeeper
 Arthur Clayton as Constable

Production
In June 1933, RKO, then under production chief Merian C. Cooper, purchased rights to the stories as a vehicle for Irene Dunne. The story was described as being about an "Australian Robin Hood."

In October 1933 Irene Dunne signed a new two-year contract with RKO the first film of which was to be Stingaree with Richard Dix, with whom she had made Cimarron. Later that month RKO announced the male lead would be Leslie Banks with Ernest B. Schoesdak to direct. Then Banks left to sign a contract with Fox.

RKO decided to replace him with John Boles, but he was not available, meaning shooting was pushed back so Dunne could make Age of Innocence. Then Boles dropped out and RKO decided to use Richard Dix, who had enjoyed a big success with Dunne in Cimarron. Filming started January 1934. Sheep were imported from Camarialla.

Release

Box Office
According to RKO records, the film lost the studio $49,000.

Critical reception
In 1934, Mordaunt Hall's review in The New York Times called the film "nicely done" and said that its "impossible happenings are highly entertaining." He went on to say that "Miss Dunne gives a charming performance and she sings several songs very agreeably."

The Los Angeles Times called it "impossible but interesting."

The film received mixed reviews in Australia. Released during preparations for the centennial celebration in Melbourne, it was described by one local paper as a "pleasant trifle" while another found it "hard to swallow" with its plot being "a little too improbable for anyone, let alone an Australian audience."

It screened in Australia in every state except New South Wales where there was a ban on bushranger films.

Preservation status and release on home video
In 1946, Stingaree, in addition to several other films, were sold out of the RKO library to producer Merian C. Cooper. On April 4 and April 11, 2007, Turner Classic Movies premiered films produced by Cooper at RKO but out of distribution for more than 50 years. According to TCM host Robert Osborne, Cooper agreed to a legal settlement with RKO in 1946, after accusing RKO of not giving him all the money due him from his RKO producer's contract in the 1930s.

The settlement gave Cooper complete ownership of several RKO titles, including Rafter Romance (1933) with Ginger Rogers, Double Harness (1933), The Right to Romance (1933), One Man's Journey (1933) with Lionel Barrymore, Living on Love (1937), and A Man to Remember (1938). According to an interview with a retired RKO executive, used as a promo on TCM for the premiere, Cooper allowed these films to be shown in 1955–1956 in a limited re-release and only in New York City.

Turner Entertainment purchased the rights to Stingaree, Turner Classic Movies remastered and released the films on DVD as part of their Lost RKO Collection. Until the rights were purchased by Turner and released on DVD, Stingaree had not been seen since a single television viewing in the late 1950s.

References

External links
 
 
 
 

1934 films
American romantic drama films
American black-and-white films
1930s English-language films
Films about opera
Films directed by William A. Wellman
Films scored by Max Steiner
Films set in colonial Australia
RKO Pictures films
Bushranger films
Films based on Australian novels
1934 romantic drama films
Films set in 1874
American historical films
1930s historical films
Films with screenplays by Garrett Fort
1930s American films